The United States of America (USA) was the host nation for the 1996 Summer Olympics in Atlanta, Georgia. 646 competitors, 375 men and 271 women, took part in 263 events in 31 sports.

The team finished first in the overall medal rankings for the first time since 1984, and for the first time since 1968 in a non-boycotted Summer Olympics.

Medalists

The following U.S. competitors won medals at the games. In the by discipline sections below, medalists' names are bolded. 

|style="text-align:left; width:78%; vertical-align:top;"|

|  style="text-align:left; width:22%; vertical-align:top;"|

* - Indicates that the athlete competed in preliminaries but not the final.

Archery

The United States claimed both of the gold medals in the men's archery competitions, with Justin Huish claiming the individual medal and the three-man team claiming the team medal.  The American women were not as successful.

Men

Women

Athletics

Men
Track & road events

Notes:* - Indicates the athlete ran in a preliminary round but not the final.

Field events

Combined events – Decathlon

Women
Track & road events

Field events

Combined events – Heptathlon

Badminton

Baseball

Baseball was open only to male amateurs in 1992 and 1996. As a result, the Americans and other nations where professional baseball is developed relied on collegiate players, while Cubans used their most experienced veterans, who technically were considered amateurs as they nominally held other jobs, but in fact trained full-time. In 2000, pros were admitted, but the MLB refused to release its players in 2000, 2004, and 2008, and the situation changed only a little: the Cubans still used their best players, while the Americans started using minor leaguers. The IOC cited the absence of the best players as the main reason for baseball being dropped from the Olympic program.

Summary

Roster
Kris Benson
R. A. Dickey
Troy Glaus
Chad Green
Seth Greisinger
Travis Lee
Augie Ojeda
Jason Williams
Chad Allen
Kip Harkrider
A. J. Hinch
Jacque Jones
Mark Kotsay
Matt LeCroy
Braden Looper
Brian Loyd
Warren Morris
Jeff Weaver
Jim Parque
Billy Koch

Round robin

Semifinal

Bronze medal game

Basketball

Summary

Men's tournament

Roster
Mitch Richmond
David Robinson
John Stockton
Shaquille O'Neal
Gary Payton
Scottie Pippen
Karl Malone
Reggie Miller
Hakeem Olajuwon
Charles Barkley
Penny Hardaway
Grant Hill
 Head coach: Lenny Wilkens

Group play

Quarterfinal

Semifinal

Gold medal game

Women's tournament

Roster
Dawn Staley
Katy Steding
Sheryl Swoopes
Katrina McClain
Nikki McCray
Carla McGhee
Venus Lacy
Lisa Leslie
Rebecca Lobo
Jennifer Azzi
Ruthie Bolton
Teresa Edwards
 Head coach: Tara VanDerveer

Group play

Quarterfinal

Semifinal

Gold medal game

Boxing

Canoeing

Slalom
Men

Women

Sprint
Men

Women

Key: QF – Qualified to medal final; SF – Qualified to semifinal; R – Qualified to repechage

Cycling

Road
Men

Women

Track

Points race

Sprint

Pursuit

Time trial

Mountain bike

Diving

Men

Women

Equestrian

Dressage

Eventing

Jumping

* - Though Matz placed high enough to qualify for the final, only three riders per nation were allowed to advance to the final.

Fencing

Fifteen fencers, nine men and six women, represented the United States in 1996.

Men

Women

Field hockey

Summary

Men's tournament

The US men's field hockey team competed for the sixth time at the Summer Olympics. On home soil the squad coached by Jon Clark once again finished twelfth and last.

Roster
Head Coach: Jon Clark

Tom Vano
Steve Danielson
Larry Amar
Marq Mellor
Scott Williams
Steve Jennings
Steven van Randwijck
Mark Wentges
John O'Neill
Eelco Wassenaar
Nick Butcher
Ahmed Elmaghraby
Phil Sykes
Otto Steffers
Ben Maruquin
Steve Wagner (GK)

Preliminary round

9th-12th place semifinal

11th place match

Women's tournament

The US women's field hockey team competed for the third time at the Summer Olympics. On home soil the team coached by Pam Hixon and finished fifth.

Roster
Head coach: Pam Hixon

Patty Shea (GK)
Laurel Martin
Liz Tchou
Marcia Pankratz
Cindy Werley
Diane Madl
Kris Fillat
Kelli James
Tracey Fuchs
Antoinette Lucas
Katie Kauffman
Andrea Wieland (GK)
Leslie Lyness
Barbara Marois
Jill Reeve
Pamela Bustin

Preliminary round

Football (soccer)

Summary

Men's tournament

Roster

Head coach: Bruce Arena

Preliminary round

Women's tournament

Roster
Head coach:  Tony DiCicco

Preliminary round

Semifinal

Gold medal match

Gymnastics

Artistic
Men
Team

Individual finals

Women
Team

Individual finals

* - Strug slightly injured her ankle during her first vault attempt in the final rotation of the team competition, then exacerbated the injury on her second attempt to dramatically clinch the gold for the United States. Due to her injury, she was unable to compete in the individual finals. This necessitated the substitution of Miller in the vault, Dawes in the floor exercise and Moceanu in the all-around.

Rhythmic
Individual

Group

Handball

Summary

Judo

Men

Women

Modern pentathlon

Rowing

Men

Women

Qualification legend: FA=Final A (medal); FB=Final B (non-medal); FC=Final C (non-medal); FD=Final D (non-medal); SA/B=Semifinal A/B; SC/D=Semifinal C/D; R=Repechage

Sailing

Men

Women

Open
Fleet racing

Mixed racing

Shooting

Men

Women

Softball

Summary

Roster
Lisa Fernandez
Leah O'Brien-Amico
Laura Berg
Lori Harrigan
Dorothy Richardson
Christa Williams
Michele Smith
Gillian Boxx
Sheila Cornell
Michele Granger
Dionna Harris
Kim Maher
Julie Smith
Shelly Stokes
Dani Tyler
 Head coach: Ralph Raymond
 Preliminary Round Robin
Defeated Puerto Rico (10:0)
Defeated Netherlands (9:0)
Defeated Japan (6:1)
Defeated Chinese Taipei (10:0)
Defeated Canada (4:2)
Lost to Australia (1:2)
Defeated PR China (3:2)
 Semifinals
Defeated PR China (1:0)
 Final
Defeated PR China (3:1)

Swimming

Men

Key: * - Swimmer competed in the heat but not the final; FA – Qualify to A final (medal); FB – Qualify to B final (non-medal)

Women

Key: * - Swimmer competed in the heat but not the final; FA – Qualify to A final (medal); FB – Qualify to B final (non-medal)

Synchronized swimming

Table tennis

Tennis

Men

Women

Volleyball

Beach

Indoor

Summary

Men

Roster
 Lloy Ball
 Bob Ctvrtlik
 Scott Fortune
 John Hyden
 Bryan Ivie
 Michael Lambert
 Dan Landry
 Jeff Nygaard
 Tom Sorensen
 Jeff Stork
 Ethan Watts
 Brett Winslow
 Head coach: Fred Sturm

Preliminary round

|}

Women

Roster
 Tara Cross-Battle
 Lori Endicott
 Caren Kemner
 Kristin Klein
 Beverly Oden
 Elaina Oden
 Danielle Scott
 Tammy Webb
 Paula Weishoff
 Tonya Williams
 Elaine Youngs
 Yoko Zetterlund
 Head coach: Terry Liskevych

Preliminary round

|}

Quarterfinal

5th - 8th semifinal

7th place match

Water polo

Summary

Roster
 Gavin Arroyo
 Troy Barnhart
 Christopher Duplanty
 Michael Scott Evans
 Everist Kirk
 Daniel Hackett
 Chris Humbert
 Kyle Kopp
 Jeremy Laster
 Rick McNair
 Chris Oeding
 Alexis Rousseau
 Wolf Wigo
 Head coach: Richard Corso

Preliminary round

Quarterfinal

5th-8th classification

7th place match

Weightlifting

Wrestling

Freestyle

Greco-Roman

See also
 United States at the 1995 Pan American Games

Notes

References

Nations at the 1996 Summer Olympics
1996
Olympics